Bingöl District (also: Merkez, meaning "central") is a district of Bingöl Province of Turkey. Its seat is the city Bingöl. Its area is 1,814 km2, and its population is 168,953 (2021).

Composition
There are three municipalities in Bingöl District:
 Bingöl
 Ilıcalar
 Sancak

There are 88 villages in Bingöl District:

 Ağaçeli
 Ağaçyolu
 Akdurmuş
 Alatepe
 Alibir
 Altınışık
 Ardıçtepe
 Arıcılar
 Aşağıakpınar
 Aşağıköy
 Bahçeli
 Balıklıçay
 Balpınar
 Bilaloğlu
 Büyüktekören
 Çavuşlar
 Çayağzı
 Çayboyu
 Çeltiksuyu
 Çevrimpınar
 Çiçekdere
 Çiçekyayla
 Çiriş
 Çobantaşı
 Çukurca
 Dallıtepe
 Dikköy
 Dikme
 Direkli
 Dişbudak
 Dügernan
 Düzyayla
 Ekinyolu
 Elmalı
 Emtağ
 Erdemli
 Erentepe
 Garip
 Gökçekanat
 Gökçeli
 Gökdere
 Göltepesi
 Gözeler
 Gözer
 Gümüşlü
 Güngören
 Gürpınar
 Güveçli
 Haziran
 İncesu
 Kardeşler
 Kartal
 Kılçadır
 Kıran
 Köklü
 Küçüktekören
 Kumgeçit
 Kurtuluş
 Kuruca
 Kurudere
 Kuşburnu
 Kuşkondu
 Oğuldere
 Olukpınar
 Ormanardı
 Ortaçanak
 Ortaköy
 Şabanköy
 Sancaklı
 Sarıçiçek
 Sudüğünü
 Sütgölü
 Suvaran
 Tepebaşı
 Topalan
 Üçyaka
 Uğurova
 Uzunsavat
 Yamaç 
 Yaygınçayır
 Yazgülü
 Yelesen
 Yenibaşlar
 Yeniköy
 Yeşilköy
 Yolçatı
 Yukarıakpınar
 Yumaklı

References

Districts of Bingöl Province